The 3 Street SW is a CTrain light rail station in downtown Calgary, Alberta, Canada. The 3 Street SW platform is used by eastbound trains, with the nearest stations serving westbound trains being and the 4 Street SW station and the 1 Street SW station. The platforms is located on the south side of 7 Avenue S and is located within the free-fare zone serving both Routes 201 and 202.

The 3 Street W station, located between 3 Street and 2 Street SW and adjacent to TD Square (shopping center) opened on May 25, 1981, as part of Calgary's original LRT line from 8 Street W to Anderson. The original station was closed on April 20, 2009, and demolished immediately with the new station constructed in its place. The new station opened on March 12, 2010.

Like all refurbished 7 Avenue platforms, the entire sidewalk slopes up to the station at both ends and the platform can handle 4-car trains.

The station registered an average of 16,300 daily boardings in 2005.

References

CTrain stations
Railway stations in Canada opened in 1981
1981 establishments in Alberta